The Mr. Hans van Mierlo Foundation is a Dutch policy institute linked to the Democrats 66 (D66) party. The foundation is named after journalist and politician Hans van Mierlo, the co-founder of the Democrats 66. On 7 May 2011 the institute was renamed again in honor of co-founder Hans van Mierlo, who had died on 11 March 2010.

References

External links
Official

  

1972 establishments in the Netherlands
Research institutes established in 1972
Foundations based in the Netherlands
Think tanks based in the Netherlands
Political organisations based in the Netherlands
Organisations based in The Hague
Foreign policy and strategy think tanks in Europe
Political and economic think tanks based in the European Union
Political and economic research foundations
Political research institutes
Civil liberties advocacy groups
European integration think tanks
Realist think tanks
Church–state separation advocacy organizations
Secularist organizations
Secularism in the Netherlands
Republicanism in the Netherlands
Liberalism in the Netherlands
Democrats 66